Alasdair Strokosch (born 21 February 1983, Paisley, Scotland) is a retired Scottish rugby union footballer who last played in the Pro D2 for USA Perpignan. He previously played for Gloucester in the Aviva Premiership and Edinburgh in the Pro12. He played as a flanker.

Strokosch started his professional career with Edinburgh Rugby. Before his first professional contract he played with Boroughmuir and East Kilbride rugby clubs.

Strokosch has represented Scotland in various competitions with the 'Sevens' and 'A' teams, his first full international cap for the Senior Scotland squad being on 25 November 2006 against Australia.

Strokosch is a member of the Scottish Institute of Sport. At the age of 12 became a black belt in karate, later representing Scotland at the European and world Under-21 karate championships. His father is German and his mother Scottish.

He was selected in the Scotland squad for the 2015 Rugby World Cup. He announced his retirement from international rugby on 5 November 2015.

References

External links
 
 
 
 

1983 births
Living people
Scottish rugby union players
Rugby union flankers
Gloucester Rugby players
Sportspeople from East Kilbride
Edinburgh Rugby players
Scotland international rugby union players
Boroughmuir RFC players
USA Perpignan players
Scottish people of German descent
Scottish expatriate rugby union players
Expatriate rugby union players in France
Scottish expatriate sportspeople in France
People educated at Claremont High School (East Kilbride)
Rugby sevens players at the 2006 Commonwealth Games
Commonwealth Games rugby sevens players of Scotland
Rugby union players from Paisley, Renfrewshire
Rugby union players from South Lanarkshire